Robinson Ekspeditionen 2005 was the eighth season of the Danish version of the Swedish show Expedition Robinson. This season premiered on September 5, 2005 and aired until November 28, 2005. This season was the first season to ditch the traditional North verses South team format in favor for one based on the locations of the contestants residences. The two teams for the season were København (Copenhagen) and Jylland (Jutland). The twists this season began in the first episode when immediately after the contestants arrived the teams were forced to compete in their first immunity challenge. Immediately following the immunity challenge, the losing team was asked to vote someone out and Poul Hansen found himself eliminated within an hour of it starting. The next twist came shortly after Poul's elimination. In a twist that would last til the merge, it was revealed that every few days one person from each team would face off in a duel against a player from the opposing team. The winner of said duel would win a spot in the merge and the power to vote to pardon any eliminated player immediately following their elimination at tribal council, while the loser would be eliminated. This series of five contestant duels and one team duel would ultimately determine who would make the merge. All players who made the merge, with the exception of Ivan who had immunity during the final team duel and Lykke who was pardoned by the winners after initially being voted out, had won a duel. Another twist came at the first tribal council when it was revealed that the contestants we each be given a certain number of votes that they could use throughout the season, but whenever they used up all of said votes they would not be given any more. In episode three, two jokers, Jesper Lodberg and Morten Aunsborg, were added to the game and unlike in previous seasons, they were allowed to pick which tribe they would compete on in episode four. Aside from all of these twists, it was revealed that contestant Nis Staak was the son of Duddie Staack and the brother of Mass Staack from the previous season. Eventually, it was Mogens Brandstrup who won the season over Lykke Maigatter and Solveig Zabell in a final challenge.

Finishing order

External links
http://www.bt.dk/underholdning/hoejroevede-koebenhavnere
http://www.bt.dk/underholdning/jyske-bonderoeve
http://www.bt.dk/underholdning/robinson-kolde-jyder-og-varme-koebenhavnere

2005 Danish television seasons
Danish reality television series
Robinson Ekspeditionen seasons